A town (町; chō or machi) is a local administrative unit in Japan.  It is a local public body along with prefecture (ken or other equivalents), city (shi), and village (mura).  Geographically, a town is contained within a district.

Note that the same word (町; machi or chō) is also used in names of smaller regions, usually a part of a ward in a city. This is a legacy of when smaller towns were formed on the outskirts of a city, only to eventually merge into it.

Towns

See also
 Municipalities of Japan
 Japanese addressing system

References

External links
 "Large City System of Japan"; graphic shows towns compared with other Japanese city types at p. 1 [PDF 7 of 40]